Dalkey may refer to:
Dalkey Island off the coast of Ireland
 Dalkey, a suburb of Dublin in Ireland named for the island
Dalkey Atmospheric Railway (1843-1854)
Dalkey railway station (1854-1964)
Dalkey Hill overlooks the village
Dalkey Quarry, disuse granite quarry (1815-1917)
Dalkey School Project, a multidenominational school established in 1978 at Glenageary in Ireland
Dalkey Book Festival, annual literature festival held in Dalkey, Ireland since 2010
Hundred of Dalkey, a cadastral unit in South Australia, named after the Irish village
Dalkey, South Australia, a locality named after the Hundred
District Council of Dalkey (1875-1932)
Dalkey Archive Press, American publisher founded in 1984
The Dalkey Archive, 1964 novel by Irish writer Flann O'Brien